Samhain, or Evil Breed: The Legend of Samhain, is a 2003 Canadian horror film, starring Bobbie Phillips, Richard Grieco, and pornographic actors Ginger Lynn Allen, Chasey Lain, Taylor Hayes, and Jenna Jameson.

The plot concerns a group of American students camping in Ireland, and studying the legends of the Druids, who are attacked by deformed mutant cannibals from the backwoods.

The film was originally produced in 2002–2003, in a longer version with more blood humor and nudity, titled simply Samhain, but languished until 2005–2006, when it was shortened, retitled Evil Breed: The Legend of Samhain, and released on DVD by Lions Gate Entertainment. It has also played on cable television on the Showtime network.

References
 "Evil Breed:The Legend of Samhain DVD", by Adam-Troy Castro, March 16, 2006, Sci Fi Channel
 "Evil Breed:The Legend of Samhain" Showtime schedule
 "Evil Breed:The Legend of Samhain DVD Review" separate reviews of longer and shorter versions of film
 "The Horror Geek Speaks: Evil Breed: The Legend of Samhain" by Mike Bracken, January 17, 2006, IGN. Criticism of the shortened re-release.

External links
 
 

Canadian slasher films
2003 horror films
Films set in Ireland
Films shot in Montreal
2003 films
Canadian comedy horror films
English-language Canadian films
Supernatural slasher films
Halloween horror films
2000s slasher films
Films about cannibalism
2000s Canadian films